Vance Gabriel Plauché (August 25, 1897 – April 2, 1976) was an American politician from Louisiana. He represented Louisiana's 7th congressional district in the United States House of Representatives. A Democrat, Plauché served for a single term in the 77th Congress, from 1941 to 1943. He was not a candidate for re-election in 1942. A lawyer, he practiced law before and after his tenure in Congress. He received his law degree from Loyola University New Orleans.

References

1897 births
Democratic Party members of the United States House of Representatives from Louisiana
1976 deaths
20th-century American politicians